Pulaski Road may refer to:

Pulaski Road (Chicago)
County Route 11 (Suffolk County, New York)

See also
Pulaski Highway (disambiguation)